Myurella pseudofortunei is a species of sea snail, a marine gastropod mollusk in the family Terebridae, the auger snails.

Description

Distribution
This marine species occurs off Papua New Guinea.

References

 Aubry U. 2008. Nuove terebre dal Mozambico. Malacologia Mostra Mondiale 59: 17-18

External links
 Fedosov, A. E.; Malcolm, G.; Terryn, Y.; Gorson, J.; Modica, M. V.; Holford, M.; Puillandre, N. (2020). Phylogenetic classification of the family Terebridae (Neogastropoda: Conoidea). Journal of Molluscan Studies

Terebridae
Gastropods described in 2008